Gérard Amoukou Okosias Gnanhouan (born 12 February 1979) is an Ivorian former professional footballer who played as a goalkeeper. He is a goalkeeping coach at Sochaux.

Career
Gnanhouan was born in Adzopé. He earned 7 caps for the Ivory Coast national team, and was called up to the 2006 World Cup, despite participating in and winning the 1997 UEFA European Under-18 Championship with France.

Honours
Sochaux
Coupe de la Ligue: 2004

Ivory Coast
Africa Cup of Nations runner-up:2006

References

External links

1979 births
Living people
People from Adzopé
Association football goalkeepers
Ivorian footballers
Ivory Coast international footballers
France youth international footballers
2006 FIFA World Cup players
INF Clairefontaine players
En Avant Guingamp players
FC Sochaux-Montbéliard players
Montpellier HSC players
US Créteil-Lusitanos players
Ivorian emigrants to France
Ligue 1 players
Vannes OC players
US Avranches players
2012 Africa Cup of Nations players